The French Mondain is a breed of fancy pigeon developed over many years of selective breeding. French Mondains, along with other varieties of domesticated pigeons, are all descendants from the rock pigeon (Columba livia). The breed was originally developed in France as a utility pigeon.

American and European styles
The French Mondain is available in two different styles. The American and European French Mondain are actually different breeds that share the same name.

Mr Pieter AH Du Toit of Southern-Africa is currently the owner of the World Champion French Mondain Pigeon called Mufasa, who won the International Pigeon Award in Brussels, Belgium, in 2010; he is commonly known as the top breeder and expert of this breed across the globe.

See also 
List of pigeon breeds

References

Pigeon breeds
Pigeon breeds originating in France

External links
 French Mondain Pigeon: Breed Guide - Pigeonpedia